The 2019 TSN All-Star Curling Skins Game was held from February 1 to 3 at The Fenlands Banff Recreation Centre in Banff, Alberta. Brendan Bottcher defeated Kevin Koe in the men's final and Jennifer Jones defeated Tracy Fleury in the women's final.

Men

Teams

Team Gushue

Skip: Brad Gushue
Third: Mark Nichols
Second: Brett Gallant
Lead: Geoff Walker

Team Koe

Skip: Kevin Koe
Third: B. J. Neufeld
Second: Colton Flasch
Lead: Ben Hebert

Team Carruthers

Fourth: Mike McEwen
Skip: Reid Carruthers
Second: Derek Samagalski
Lead: Colin Hodgson

Team Bottcher

Skip: Brendan Bottcher
Third: Darren Moulding
Second: Bradley Thiessen
Lead: Karrick Martin

Results
All times listed in Mountain Standard Time.

Semifinals
Gushue vs. Bottcher
Friday, February 1, 6:00 pm

Koe vs. Carruthers
Saturday, February 2, 1:00 pm

Final
Sunday, February 3, 1:00 pm

Winnings
The prize winnings for each team are listed below:

Women

Teams

Team Jones

Skip: Jennifer Jones
Third: Kaitlyn Lawes
Second: Jocelyn Peterman
Lead: Dawn McEwen

Team Einarson

Skip: Kerri Einarson
Third: Val Sweeting
Second: Shannon Birchard
Lead: Briane Meilleur

Team Scheidegger

Skip: Casey Scheidegger
Third: Cary-Anne McTaggart
Second: Jessie Haughian
Lead: Kristie Moore

Team Fleury

Skip: Tracy Fleury
Third: Selena Njegovan
Second: Liz Fyfe
Lead: Kristin MacCuish

Results
All times listed in Mountain Standard Time.

Semifinals
Einarson vs. Fleury
Saturday, February 2, 9:00 am

Jones vs. Scheidegger
Saturday, February 2, 5:00 pm

Final
Sunday, February 3, 9:00 am

Winnings
The prize winnings for each team are listed below:

Notes

References

2019 in Canadian curling
Curling in Alberta
TSN Skins Game
TSN All-Star
Banff, Alberta
TSN All-Star Curling Skins Game